Reporter's privilege in the United States (also journalist's privilege, newsman's privilege, or press privilege), is a "reporter's protection under constitutional or statutory law, from being compelled to testify about confidential information or sources." It may be described in the US as the qualified (limited) First Amendment or statutory right many jurisdictions have given to journalists in protecting their confidential sources from discovery. 

The First, Second, Third, Fifth, Eighth, Ninth, Tenth, Eleventh, and D.C. Circuits have all held that a qualified reporter's privilege exists. In the recent case of U.S. v. Sterling, the Fourth expressly denied a reporter's privilege exists under Branzburg. Furthermore, forty-nine states and the District of Columbia have enacted statutes called shield laws protecting journalists' anonymous sources.

United States

Department of Justice guidelines (United States) 

The United States Department of Justice created self-imposed guidelines intended to protect the news media by regulating the use of subpoenas against the press. These guidelines state that the government "should have made all reasonable attempts to obtain the information from alternative, non-media sources” before considering issuing a subpoena to a member of the news media. Furthermore, the guidelines require that federal prosecutors negotiate with the press, explaining the specific needs of the case.

Before any subpoena may be issued, the attorney general must approve the issuance.  The attorney general’s review for a subpoena to a member of the news media shall be based on the following criteria:
 In criminal cases, there should be reasonable grounds to believe, based on information obtained from non-media sources, that a crime has occurred, and that the information sought is essential to a successful investigation—particularly with reference to directly establishing guilt or innocence. The subpoena should not be used to obtain peripheral, nonessential, or speculative information.
 In civil cases there should be reasonable grounds, based on non-media sources, to believe that the information sought is essential to the successful completion of the litigation in a case of substantial importance. The subpoena should not be used to obtain peripheral, nonessential, or speculative information.
 The government should have unsuccessfully attempted to obtain the information from alternative non-media sources.
 The use of subpoenas to members of the news media should, except under exigent circumstances, be limited to the verification of published information and to such surrounding circumstances as relate to the accuracy of the published information.
 Even subpoena authorization requests for publicly disclosed information should be treated with care to avoid claims of harassment.
 Subpoenas should, wherever possible, be directed at material information regarding a limited subject matter, should cover a reasonably limited period of time, and should avoid requiring production of a large volume of unpublished material. They should give reasonable and timely notice of the demand for documents.

While these guidelines seem extremely protective of the press, they explicitly deny the creation of “any right or benefit, substantive or procedural, enforceable at law.” Nor does the policy have any substantive punishment for the federal government violations. If the federal prosecutors fail to obtain approval from the attorney general, the extent of the authorized punishment is “an administrative reprimand or other appropriate disciplinary action.” In fact, some courts have found that the guidelines “create no enforceable right.” Therefore, in circuits taking this approach, the news media have no right to appeal for enforcement of these policies before being compelled to testify.

Judith Miller's attempted use of reporter's privilege 
The issue of a reporter's privilege came to the forefront of media attention in the 2005 case In re Miller, involving reporters Judith Miller and Matthew Cooper. Miller and Cooper were both served with grand jury subpoenas for testimony and information, including notes and documents pertaining to conversations with specific and all other official sources relating the Plame affair. Both refused to submit to the subpoenas, claiming a reporter’s privilege.  The federal district court held both Miller and Cooper in civil contempt of court, and the United States Court of Appeals for the District of Columbia Circuit upheld the orders of contempt.

Miller and Cooper, in their appeal to the appellate court pleaded several defenses including a First Amendment reporter’s privilege and a common law reporter’s privilege. The appellate court rejected both the First Amendment and common law claims for privilege. The court held Miller and Cooper in civil contempt of court and sentenced both to eighteen months of jail time. The sentence was stayed pending an appeal to the U.S. Supreme Court.

However, the U.S. Supreme Court refused to hear the case.  Judith Miller began serving the remaining four months of the original eighteen-month sentence on July 6, 2005. Matthew Cooper’s confidential source released him from their confidentiality agreement, so he chose to comply with the subpoena and has agreed to testify before the grand jury.

Congressional proposals 
In 2004, two significant bills were introduced in the United States House of Representatives and in the United States Senate to create a federal shield law. The first bill was introduced in identical form in both the Senate and the House by Senator Richard Lugar (R-IN) and Representative Mike Pence (R-IN). Senator Christopher Dodd (D-CT) introduced separate legislation that created a seemingly broader protection than the Pence/Lugar bill.

In 2006, Rodney A. Smolla testified before the Senate Judiciary Committee on the topic of reporter's privilege.

On December 2, 2010, in a reaction to the United States diplomatic cables leak by WikiLeaks, John Ensign (R-NV) introduced S.4004 to amend section 798 of title 18, United States Code, to provide penalties for disclosure of classified information related to certain intelligence activities and for other purposes. While titled the SHIELD Act, the proposed legislation has little in common with shield laws in the United States.

See also
Branzburg v. Hayes
Free Flow of Information Act
In re Madden
Privilege (evidence)
Shield laws in the United States
Subpoena duces tecum
Von Bulow v. Von Bulow

References 

Freedom of expression
Sources (journalism)
Privileged communication
Journalism